Chrysanthemoides is one of eight genera of the Calenduleae, with a centre of diversity in South Africa. The genus contains only two species, but is known for the invasive "Bitou Bush" Chrysanthemoides monilifera. Studies of this genus have determined that there is a large amount of genetic variation between populations, suggesting an extreme adaptive capability in the plants. Some of these variations are recognised, such as Chrysanthemoides monilifera subsp. rotundata.

The name "Chrysanthemoides" means "having the appearance of chrysanthemum".

 Species
 Chrysanthemoides incana (Burm.f.) Norl. - Cape Provinces, Namibia
 Chrysanthemoides monilifera (L.) Norl. - Cape Provinces; naturalized in parts of western Europe, Australia, New Zealand, Chile

References 

Calenduleae
Asteraceae genera
Flora of the Cape Provinces